Robert Bowie (March 1750 – January 8, 1818) served as the 11th Governor of the state of Maryland in the United States, from 1803 to 1806, and from 1811 to 1812.

He was the third child born to Captain William Bowie and Margaret Sprigg, at Mattaponi.  He graduated from Charlotte Hall Military Academy.

He also served in the Maryland House of Delegates from 1785 to 1790, and from 1801 to 1803.

References

Further reading

External links

1750 births
1818 deaths
Bowie family
People from Prince George's County, Maryland
Maryland Democratic-Republicans
Governors of Maryland
Members of the Maryland House of Delegates
Charlotte Hall Military Academy alumni
People of Maryland in the American Revolution
Democratic-Republican Party state governors of the United States
Sprigg family